Bodin Isara (born 12 December 1990) is badminton player and Rattana Bundit University's student from Thailand. He competed for Thailand at the 2012 Summer Olympics with Maneepong Jongjit but was defeated in the quarterfinals by Malaysia's Koo Kien Keat and Tan Boon Heong. In 2013, Isara switched from competing for the national squad to competing for the Granular Club, an independent badminton club in Thailand. Currently his partner is Nipitphon Phuangphuapet.

On 21 July 2013, Isara was suspended for two years for his role in a brawl with former teammate Maneepong Jongjit during the men's doubles final at the 2013 Canada Open Grand Prix.

Achievements

Southeast Asian Games 
Men's doubles

Mixed doubles

Summer Universiade 
Men's doubles

BWF World Tour 
The BWF World Tour, which was announced on 19 March 2017 and implemented in 2018, is a series of elite badminton tournaments sanctioned by the Badminton World Federation (BWF). The BWF World Tour is divided into levels of World Tour Finals, Super 1000, Super 750, Super 500, Super 300 (part of the HSBC World Tour), and the BWF Tour Super 100.

Men's doubles

BWF Superseries 
The BWF Superseries, which was launched on 14 December 2006 and implemented in 2007, was a series of elite badminton tournaments, sanctioned by the Badminton World Federation (BWF). BWF Superseries levels were Superseries and Superseries Premier. A season of Superseries consisted of twelve tournaments around the world that had been introduced since 2011. Successful players were invited to the Superseries Finals, which were held at the end of each year.

Men's doubles

  BWF Superseries Finals tournament
  BWF Superseries Premier tournament
  BWF Superseries tournament

BWF Grand Prix 
The BWF Grand Prix had two levels, the Grand Prix and Grand Prix Gold. It was a series of badminton tournaments sanctioned by the Badminton World Federation (BWF) and played between 2007 and 2017.

Men's doubles

Mixed doubles

  BWF Grand Prix Gold tournament
  BWF Grand Prix tournament

BWF International Challenge/Series 
Men's doubles

Mixed doubles

  BWF International Challenge tournament
  BWF International Series tournament

Controversy 
On 21 July 2013, Isara and his former partner, Jongjit had a brawl during the change of ends of the men's doubles finals at the 2013 Canadian Open Grand Prix. Jongjit, who was partnered with Nipitphon Phuangphuapet, met Isara and his new partner, Pakkawat Vilailak in the finals. The former partners who had unresolved issues with each other prior to the match started abusing each other vocally during the first game. This led Isara to begin chasing down Jongit across the arena. As an act of self-defense while running away from Isara, Jongit swung his badminton racquet to the side of Isara's head causing his right ear to bleed and require stitches. Isara eventually caught up with Jongit, who fell to the floor on the adjacent court, and began hitting, punching and kicking him. The two were eventually broken up by Isara's partner and their coach. As a result, both players received a sanction from the Badminton World Federation and from the Badminton Association of Thailand. Isara, the more physically abusive one among the two, was banned for 2 years from participating in any international tournaments. Jongjit, who provoked Isara during the match, was banned for 3 months. In addition, Isara and Vilailak received a black card during the event meaning disqualification from the tournament and the tournament victory was awarded to Jongjit and Phuangphuapet.

On 9 December 2022, Isara and his friends were arrested after he played a part in abducting and doing physical harm to a teenager who allegedly owned him and his friends 1 million Thai Baht from illegal betting for the 2022 FIFA World Cup. At the time of writing, a trial has not been underway.

References

External links 
 
 

1990 births
Living people
Bodin Isara
Bodin Isara
Badminton players at the 2012 Summer Olympics
Badminton players at the 2016 Summer Olympics
Bodin Isara
Badminton players at the 2010 Asian Games
Bodin Isara
Asian Games medalists in badminton
Medalists at the 2010 Asian Games
Competitors at the 2009 Southeast Asian Games
Competitors at the 2011 Southeast Asian Games
Competitors at the 2015 Southeast Asian Games
Competitors at the 2017 Southeast Asian Games
Competitors at the 2019 Southeast Asian Games
Bodin Isara
Bodin Isara
Southeast Asian Games medalists in badminton
Bodin Isara
Bodin Isara
Universiade medalists in badminton
Medalists at the 2011 Summer Universiade
Medalists at the 2015 Summer Universiade